The phonology of Old Saxon mirrors that of the other ancient Germanic languages, and also, to a lesser extent, that of modern West Germanic languages such as English, Dutch, Frisian, German, and Low German.

Old Saxon is an Ingvaeonic language, which means that it belongs to the West Germanic branch of the Germanic languages and that it is particularly closely related to Old English and Old Frisian. Thus, anyone looking at Old Saxon phonology will recognize some typical West-Germanic phonological features also found in Old English, such as gemination and the different pronunciations of the letter g.

Distinctive features
This contrasts with Old High German, which monophthongizes *ai and *au only in front of certain consonants and word-finally, thus creating no distinction between older *ai and its umlaut. In a similar vein, Old English merges both Proto-Germanic *au and *auw into , whereas Old Frisian partially merges older *ai and *au into /ā/.

Old Saxon, unlike the other West Germanic languages, consistently preserves Germanic -j- after a consonant, e.g. ('savior'), cf.

Consonants
The table below lists the consonantal phonemes of Old Saxon.

Notes

The other two allophones continued to be written as before.
 Fricatives were devoiced again word finally and before voiceless consonants. Beginning in the later Old Saxon period, stops became devoiced word-finally as well.
In some regions, it might have been realized as palatal  when in contact with front vowels.
 The fricatives  might have been labiodental or bilabial, as in Proto-Germanic.
  could have been either dental  or alveolar .
  was almost certainly apico-alveolar, and possibly retracted, as in Old and Middle High German, modern Icelandic and most notably Westphalian Low German, the most conservative modern descendant of Old Saxon.
  had a velar allophone  when it occurred before the velars .
  was stopped in gemination and after . This process occurs in all West Germanic languages.
 Before front vowels, it was palatalized to some extent, probably resulting in post-palatal  or palatal .
  was most likely alveolar, either a trill  or a tap .
 Most consonants could be geminated. Notably, gemination of  gave , and gemination of  gave .
  was not devoiced before .
  was strongly palatalized before front vowels and affricated in the late stages of the language. This process was fully reverted in Middle Low German, with the exception of very few relic words, where the consonant merges into .

Vowels

Notes:

 Although not indicated in spelling, it is likely that all vowels also occurred in a nasalized form where Proto-Germanic had a nasal consonant before a fricative. This can be inferred from the fact that Middle Low German restores the consonant in almost all instances, which would not have been possible from oral vowels.
 Long vowels were rare in unstressed syllables and mostly occurred due to suffixation or compounding.
 The pronunciations of most vowels are only given as indicators of their pronunciation relative to each other and do not represent absolute values, which might be higher or lower.
These allophones became phonemicized when unstressed vowels were elided in later stages of Old Saxon. This process of fronting and phonemization is called 'primary umlaut' by scholars of Old Saxon and Old High German. This second wave is called 'secondary umlaut'.
They may have been front , central , back  or mixed (e.g.  was front , whereas  was back ).
 Long  offers no hint as to its pronunciation. It descends from Proto-Germanic /æː/ (*ē) hinting at a frontal pronunciation in old West Germanic times.  On the other hand, it became a rounded back vowel in all descendants of Old Saxon.
 The more open  represents Proto-Germanic *e. It was spelled .
 The closed phoneme  represents the umlaut of Proto-Germanic *a and *e. The two phonemes are only distinguished in southern dialects in modern times, merging into  in most regions.
It was spelled  well into the Renaissance, before  became the dominant spelling.
  and  stem from Proto-Germanic *ai and *au.
 Closed  and  continue Proto-Germanic *ē and *ō.
It was spelled , just like its short equivalent of later times.

Diphthongs

Notes:

Unlike , they are always followed by a corresponding semivowel, as in hauwan and breuwan. Thus they could just as well be analyzed as a short vowel followed by a geminated consonant.
For example, Proto-Germanic *blōaną/*wēaną gave Old Saxon blōian and wāian, whose 3rd person singulars were blōid/wāid. (Cf. a class 7 verb with medial consonant: hētan, 3rd Person hētid.)
These were however treated as two-syllable sequences of a long vowel followed by a short one, not proper diphthongs.

See also
 Old Saxon
 Old Saxon grammar

References
 
 
 
 

Phonology
Germanic phonologies